"Are You Havin' Any Fun?" is a song with lyrics by Jack Yellen and music by Sammy Fain. It featured in the Broadway review series George White's Scandals in 1939. A popular recording in 1939 was by Tommy Dorsey and His Orchestra with vocals by Edythe Wright.

Other recordings
 British musical comedy duo Flanagan and Allen incorporated this in their popular Music Hall act of the 1930s and 1940s:
Elaine Stritch's recording from her 1956 album Stritch 
Tony Bennett recorded the song on his 1959 album Strike Up the Band with Count Basie,  
In 2006 Bennett re-recorded the song for his album Duets: An American Classic as a duet with Elvis Costello.

Popular culture
The Tony Bennett recording is featured in the 2012 film Quartet, the first film directed by Dustin Hoffman. The song is also performed in the film by Trevor Peacock and David Ryall, as a homage to Flanagan and Allen, the famous British music hall artists. Peacock and Ryall also perform "Underneath the Arches", a signature song of Flanagan and Allen.

References

External links
Lyrics at oldielyrics.com

1939 songs
Songs from musicals
Songs written by Jack Yellen
Songs with music by Sammy Fain
Tony Bennett songs
1930s jazz standards